Louis Lee (born 20 April 1947) is a Taiwanese physicist.

Academic career
Lee earned a bachelor's degree in physics from National Taiwan University in 1969, and obtained a master's and doctorate in the subject from the California Institute of Technology, ending his studies in 1975. Lee then worked at the Goddard Space Flight Center and taught at the University of Maryland before joining the University of Alaska faculty. Lee returned to Taiwan and began teaching at National Cheng Kung University in 1995. Lee is a member of the Academia Sinica. He has served as the director of the National Applied Research Laboratories and the National Space Program Office. As leader of the NSPO, Lee presided over the launch of the satellite ROCSAT-2 and the development of ROCSAT-3. Lee also helped conduct research on thunderclouds and the ionosphere. He later became president of National Central University and was named minister of the National Science Council in April 2008. Lee was replaced by Cyrus Chu in February 2011.

References

1947 births
20th-century Taiwanese physicists
National Taiwan University alumni
California Institute of Technology alumni
Goddard Space Flight Center people
University of Alaska Fairbanks faculty
University of Maryland, College Park faculty
Living people
Ministers of Science and Technology of the Republic of China
Members of Academia Sinica
21st-century Taiwanese physicists